Liu Di (Traditional Chinese: 劉荻; Simplified Chinese: 刘荻; Pinyin: Liú Dí; born October 9, 1981), writing under the screen name "Stainless Steel Rat" (不锈钢老鼠), named after the assertive Harry Harrison science fiction character, became a symbol for democracy and free speech in China since her detention in November 2002. Her screen-name is often translated as Stainless Steel Mouse.

Biography
Liu Di graduated as a psychology major from Beijing Normal University.

Liu's case comes during a crackdown on Internet content as the government struggles to gain control over a new and popular medium.

The reasons for Liu's detention were satirizing the CCP online and calling for the release of other "cyber-dissidents."

She was freed from Beijing's Qincheng prison on Friday, November 28, 2003. Two other "cyber-dissidents", Wu Yiran, and Li Yibin, were also freed from a jail for political detainees.

References

See also
List of Chinese dissidents
International Freedom of Expression Exchange monitors Internet censorship in China 

1981 births
Living people
Beijing Normal University alumni
Charter 08 signatories
Chinese dissidents
Prisoners and detainees of the People's Republic of China